Fernando Francesco d'Ávalos, 5th Marquess of Pescara (or Ferrante Francesco d'Ávalos); Spanish: Francisco Fernando de Ávalos, (11 November 1489 – 3 December 1525), was an Italian  condottiero of Aragonese (Spanish) origin. He was an important figure of the Italian Wars:  in the Battle of Ravenna in 1512 he was taken prisoner by the French, but was released at the conclusion of the War of the League of Cambrai. He was the chief commander of the Habsburg armies of Charles V in Italy during the Habsburg-Valois Wars and defeated the French at Bicocca and Pavia.

Biography
Fernando was born at Naples, but his family was of Aragonese origin, having arrived in southern Italy with Alfonso V's general Iñigo d'Avalos, his grandfather.  Fernando's father was Alfonso d'Ávalos d'Aquino, 4th marquis of Pescara (not to be confused with Alfonso d'Ávalos, 6th marquess of Pescara and a cousin of Fernando). Despite his birthplace he considered himself a Spaniard, spoke Spanish at all times, even to his wife, and was always surrounded by Spanish soldiers and officers.

Farnando's father was killed during a French invasion of Naples, while the boy was still a babe in arms. At the age of six the boy was betrothed to Vittoria Colonna, daughter of the general Fabrizio Colonna, and the marriage was celebrated in 1509 on the island of Ischia. His position as a noble of the Aragonese party in Naples made it incumbent on him to support Ferdinand the Catholic in his Italian wars. In 1512, he commanded a body of light cavalry at the battle of Ravenna, where he was wounded and taken prisoner by the French. Thanks to the intervention of one of the foremost of the French generals, the Italian G. G. Trivulzio, who was his connection by marriage, he was allowed to ransom himself for 6,000 ducats.

He commanded the Spanish infantry at the Battle of La Motta, or Vicenza, on October 7, 1513. It was on this occasion that he called his men before the charge to take care to step on him before the enemy did if he fell. From the battle of Vicenza in 1513, down to the Battle of Bicocca on April 29, 1522, he continued to serve in command of the Spaniards and as the colleague rather than the subordinate of Prospero Colonna.

After the battle of Bicocca Charles V appointed  Colonna commander-in-chief. D'Ávalos, who considered himself aggrieved, made a journey to Valladolid in Spain, where the emperor then was, to state his own claims. Charles V, with whom he had long and confidential interviews, persuaded him to submit for the time to the superiority of Colonna. But in these meetings he gained the confidence of Charles V. His Spanish descent and sympathies marked him out as a safer commander of the imperial troops in Italy than a "full" Italian could have been.

When Francis I invaded Italy in 1524 d'Ávalos was appointed as lieutenant of the emperor to repel the invasion. The difficulties of his position were very great, for there was much discontent in the army, which was very ill-paid. The tenacity, patience and tact of d'Ávalos triumphed over all obstacles. His influence over the veteran Spanish troops and the German mercenaries kept them loyal during the long siege of Pavia.

On February 24, 1525, he defeated and took prisoner Francis I by a brilliant attack. D'Ávalos' plan was remarkable for its audacity and for the skill he showed in destroying the superior French heavy cavalry by assailing them in flank with a mixed force of harquebusiers and light horse. It was believed that he was dissatisfied with the treatment he had received from the emperor, and Girolamo Morone, secretary to Francesco II Sforza, duke of Milan, approached him with a scheme for expelling French, Spaniards and Germans alike from Italy, and for gaining a throne for himself. D'Ávalos may have listened to the tempter, but in act he was loyal. He reported the offer to Charles V and put Morone into prison. His health, however, had begun to give way under the strain of wounds and exposure, during late November, and he died at Milan on December 3, 1525.

Family
D'Ávalos had no children; his title descended to his cousin Alfonso d'Ávalos, Marques of Vasto, also a distinguished imperial general (who in fact led the Imperial musketeers at Pavia).

In literature
The Italian historiographer Paolo Giovio published a contemporary biography in Latin of Fernando Francesco which was included in his Vitae (illustrium virorum). 
It was subsequently translated by Lodovico Domenichi and published in Florence in 1551. Giovio's biography was also translated into Spanish by Pedro de Vallés in 1553 as Historia del fortissimo y prudentissimo capitan Don Hernando de Ávalos.

The novel Die Versuchung des Pescara by Conrad Ferdinand Meyer is about him.

John Webster's 'The Duchess of Malfi', first performed in 1613–1614, makes numerous references to The Marquess.

References

Sources
 Taylor, Frederick Lewis. The Art of War in Italy, 1494-1529. Westport: Greenwood Press, 1973. .
 

1489 births
1525 deaths
Fernando
Nobility from Naples
16th-century condottieri
Military leaders of the Italian Wars
Spanish generals
Italian people of Spanish descent
Generals of the Holy Roman Empire
Military personnel from Naples
16th-century Neapolitan people